Jawhar  is a city and a municipal council in Palghar district of Maharashtra state in Konkan division of India. Jawhar was a capital city of the erstwhile Koli princely state of Jawhar.
Situated in the ranges of the Western Ghats, Jawhar is known for its picturesque setting and a vibrant cultural heritage.  It is one of the few remaining tribal regions of Maharashtra and is known for its vibrant Warli painting that are a characteristic landmark of this place.
Established in 1918, Jawhar is one of the oldest municipal councils in the state of Maharashtra and tourist spot near Mumbai.

History 

The Jawhar state was founded by Raja Jayaba Mukne in 1343, with Jawhar as its capital. The state went through many transitions and lasted for over six hundred years until its accession into the Union of India in 1947. During the British Raj, as a princely state, it was a part of Bombay Presidency and had a 9-gun salute status. 
Although a capital city, Jawhar's development was largely neglected by successive rulers, due to a low revenue generation and haphazard organisation. However, Jawhar witnessed a significant development in the reign of Raja Patang Shah IV and subsequent rulers. Raja Patang Shah V (Yashswant Rao) Mukne was the last ruler of Jawhar before its formal integration in the Union of Indian in 1947.

Geography 
Jawhar taluka is tropical area and it mostly  surrounded by deciduous green plants. It has an average elevation of 447 metres (1466 feet).It is about 80 km from Nashik and about 145 km from Mumbai by road.

Climate
Jawhar has a tropical monsoon climate (Am) with little to no rainfall from November to May and extremely heavy rainfall from June to September with moderate rainfall in October.

Air Quality Index= Below 10

Tourist attractions

Tourist Spot Near Mumbai
Best place for one day picnic near Mumbai with relaxing nature.

Jaivilas Palace 
The Jai Vilas Palace is a historic tourist attraction in Jawhar. This neoclassical-style palace was built by Raja Yashwant Rao Mukane. This palace is also known as Raj Bari and used to be a residential palace of the  Mukne royal family. Built on a hill top, this palace is a master piece of architecture with blend of Western and Indian styles of architecture in majestic pink stones. The interiors of this palace display the rich culture and lifestyle of tribal kings of Mukne family. The palace is surrounded by a garden with a dense forest like foliage, having trees of Cashew everywhere.

The place is built in the Syenite stone, brought from an quarry at Sakhara, which is 12 km from its location. It is said that when the work of the palace was completed, the quarry from, which the stones were extracted was broken down and covered; the  exact location of the quarry is lost in time.  The Geological Department, of Government of India has now taken up a task to locate the lost quarry.
Due to its architecture style and location, the palace has featured in several films in Marathi and Hindi.

Hanuman Point 

Towards east of the city, nearly 1 to 2 km from the city center, there is an old temple of Maruti; this temple is known as Katya Maruti mandir due surrounded dark forest of cactus. The temple is surrounded by valleys on three sides. The valley is nearly 500 feet deep. During renovation a view point was created near the temple, which is known as Hanuman Point.  During the day time, one can see the historical fort of Shahapur Maholi from this point, while during night time, it is possible to see lights of train in Kasara ghat form this point. The valley also known as Devkobacha Kada.

Sunset Point 

Nearly 0.5 km towards west, from the heart of the city, there is a heritage of lovers called a Sunset point. The shape of the valley around the Sunset point is like Bow, therefore earlier it was known as Dhanukamal. During sunset, one can see the mountain of Mahalaxmi near Dahanu, which is nearly 60 km from Jawhar.

Dabhosa waterfall 

Dabhosa- Dadarkopara -waterfall is only 18 km away from on Jawhar — Talasari — Silvasa Road. This waterfall is on Lendi river and on other side of river at Sarsun there is Dadarkopara Waterfall. The Dadarkopara fall usually gets dry during summer, therefore is also known as Suka (Dry) fall. The height of waterfall is about 300 feet. The water from Lendi river first flows in the flask shaped rock and from there it flows in 5 feet by 5 feet flask shaped open natural container made of rocks. The waterfalls are surround by straight mountains of height not less than 600 feet on both sides and are covered with Medicinal plants.

Dabhosa waterfall is one of the highest waterfalls in Maharashtra. To top it all this is one of the very few waterfalls which is perennial. The crater shaped bowl into which the waterfall cascades and the lake at the bottom of the waterfall is truly a spectacular site.

Kal Mandavi Waterfall 

The Kal Mandavi waterfall is about 100 meters in height and it flows throughout the year, and not just during the monsoons season. However, the most scenic views of the waterfall are during monsoon season.
Kalmandi is name of waterfall that situated at near Apatale gaon.
Jawhar to Kalmandi is approximately 5–6 km via Jawhar-Zap road.

Khad-Khad Dam 
This is one of the major dams near Jawhar city. The excess water of dam flows through the huge rocks (just ahead the dam) which can be seen in a form of a waterfall.

Shirpamal 
The Shirpamal is a place of historical importance. Shivaji had stayed here over-night, en route to plunder Surat. This point was developed by Advocate R.P. Mukne, President of Jawhar Municipal Council in 1995.

Divya Vidyalaya 
Divya Vidyalaya is a Residential School for Special Children. The school offers special education and residential facilities to over 100 visually & mentally challenged tribal boys and girls. The school & residential buildings have been supported by Sewa International, UK and has ultra modern facilities. It is one of the best Special Schools located in tribal areas in Maharashtra.

Administration 

Jawhar is an administrative headquarters of Jawhar Taluka. 

Jawhar, the sex ratio is more because of most of male migrate for employment during some periods.

In popular culture 
Jawhar is known for its unique tribal culture, including the Warli/varli painting as well as various traditional cultures like Bohada (fair) in which one can see tribal culture as it has been followed from ancient times. Jawhar and its surrounding places have featured in a number of films.
 In the film Great Grand Masti, the Jaivilas Palace was shown as an ancestral haveli of one of the lead characters.
 The song "Mast Malanga" from Marathi movie One Way Ticket was shot at the Jaivilas Palace.
 This palace featured as the Haunted Haveli in Varun Thakur's Web Series, Shaitan Haveli

Notable people 
 Jayabha Mukne, founder of the Jawhar State
 Yashwantrao Martandrao Mukne, last Maharaja of the Jawhar State

References 

Cities and towns in Palghar district
Cities in Maharashtra